The number density (symbol: n or ρN) is an intensive quantity used to describe the degree of concentration of countable objects (particles, molecules, phonons, cells, galaxies, etc.) in physical space: three-dimensional volumetric number density, two-dimensional areal number density, or one-dimensional linear number density. Population density is an example of areal number density. The term number concentration (symbol: lowercase n, or C, to avoid confusion with amount of substance indicated by uppercase N) is sometimes used in chemistry for the same quantity, particularly when comparing with other concentrations.

Definition
Volume number density is the number of specified objects per unit volume:

where N is the total number of objects in a volume V. 

Here it is assumed that N is large enough that rounding of the count to the nearest integer does not introduce much of an error, however V is chosen to be small enough that the resulting n does not depend much on the size or shape of the volume V because of large-scale features.

Area number density is the number of specified objects per unit area, A:

Similarly, linear number density is the number of specified objects per unit length, L:

Units
In SI units, number density is measured in m−3, although cm−3 is often used. However, these units are not quite practical when dealing with atoms or molecules of gases, liquids or solids at room temperature and atmospheric pressure, because the resulting numbers are extremely large (on the order of 1020).

Relation to other quantities

Molar concentration
For any substance, the number density can be expressed in terms of its amount concentration c (in mol/m3) as

where  is the Avogadro constant. This is still true if the spatial dimension unit, metre, in both n and c is consistently replaced by any other spatial dimension unit, e.g. if n is in cm−3 and c is in mol/cm3, or if n is in L−1 and c is in mol/L, etc.

Mass density
For atoms or molecules of a well-defined molar mass M (in kg/mol), the number density can sometimes be expressed in terms of their mass density ρm (in kg/m3) as

Note that the ratio M/NA is the mass of a single atom or molecule in kg.

Examples

See also
Columnar number density

References and notes

Density
Population geography
Scalar physical quantities